Li Shuai (born 18 August 1982) is a Chinese former footballer who played as a goalkeeper.

Club career
Li Shuai started his football career playing for Qingdao Jonoon's youth academy. In the 2002 season, Li was promoted to the first team and made his debut on 1 September 2002 in a 4-1 loss against Beijing Guoan. After several seasons as the backup goalkeeper, Li would start to rise to prominence by playing in 23 league games during the 2005 season as he established himself as the first-choice goalkeeper. The following season for Li was to prove unsuccessful with Qingdao as they flirted with relegation. He also found himself playing a significantly smaller role within the team by playing in only thirteen games within the season.

At the start of the 2007 season, Li transferred to second tier side Guangzhou GPC. After only one season with the team, he quickly established himself as the first-choice goalkeeper and saw Guangzhou immediately promoted to the top tier after winning the second tier title. Within the top tier again, Li would make sure the club were midtable regulars for the next several seasons until the club were relegated for match-fixing at the end of the 2009 season which occurred in 2006 before he joined the club. Despite this, Li remained loyal towards the club and he went on to make his 100th appearance for Guangzhou on 18 September 2010 in a 2-1 win against Yanbian FC. He became the club's second-choice goalkeeper after June 2011. He was linked with fellow Chinese Super League side Shanghai Shenhua at the end of the 2014 season; however, he decided to stay in Guangzhou and signed a one-year extension with an option to a second year with the club on 19 November 2014.

On 19 January 2016, Li transferred to Shanghai Shenhua. He made his debut for the club on 5 March 2016 in a 1-1 draw against Yanbian Fude. Li played 29 league matches in the 2016 season as the club won qualification to the AFC Champions League for the first time since 2011. He received a special contribution award from the club along with Obafemi Martins on 2 November 2016 for the season he had with the club. For the next several seasons he would be an integral member of the team that won the 2017 and 2019 Chinese FA Cup's. On 3 March 2022 Li decided to officially retire from professional football at the age of 39 and move into coaching.

Career statistics

Honours

Club
Guangzhou Evergrande
Chinese Super League: 2011, 2012, 2013, 2014, 2015
China League One: 2007, 2010
Chinese FA Cup: 2012
Chinese FA Super Cup: 2012
AFC Champions League: 2013, 2015

Shanghai Shenhua
Chinese FA Cup: 2017, 2019

References

External links

1982 births
Living people
Chinese footballers
Footballers from Qingdao
Shanghai Shenhua F.C. players
Guangzhou F.C. players
Qingdao Hainiu F.C. (1990) players
Chinese Super League players
China League One players
Association football goalkeepers